This is a list of diseases starting with the letter "V".

Va

Vac–Van
 Vaccinophobia
 VACTERL association
 VACTERL association with hydrocephaly, X linked
 VACTERL hydrocephaly
 Vacuolar myopathy
 Vagabond's disease
 Vaginismus
 Vaginiosis (bacterial, cytologic)
 Vagneur–Triolle–Ripert syndrome
 Valinemia
 Valproic acid antenatal infection
 Valvular dysplasia of the child
 Van Allen–Myhre syndrome
 Van Bogaert–Hozay syndrome
 Van De Berghe–Dequeker syndrome
 Van Den Bosch syndrome
 Van Den Ende–Brunner syndrome
 Van der Woude syndrome
 Van der Woude syndrome 2
 Van Goethem syndrome
 Van Maldergem–Wetzburger–Verloes syndrome
 Van Regemorter–Pierquin–Vamos syndrome
 Vancomycin-resistant Enterococcus (Vancomycin-resistant enterococcal bacteremia)

Var–Vat
 Varadi–Papp syndrome
 Varicella virus antenatal infection
 Varicella zoster
 Variegate porphyria
 Vas deferens, congenital bilateral aplasia of
 Vascular disruption sequence
 Vascular helix of umbilical cord
 Vascular malformations of the brain
 Vascular malposition
 Vascular purpura
 Vasculitis
 Vasculitis hypersensitivity
 Vasculitis, cutaneous necrotizing
 Vasopressin-resistant diabetes insipidus
 Vasovagal syncope
 Vasquez–Hurst–Sotos syndrome
 VATER association

Ve

Vei–Ven
 Vein of Galen aneurysmal malformationss (VGAM)
 Vein of Galen aneurysmal dilatation (VGAD)
 Velocardiofacial syndrome
 Velofacioskeletal syndrome
 Velopharyngeal incompetence
 Venencie Powell Winkelmann syndrome
 Ventricular extrasystoles perodactyly Robin sequence
 Ventricular familial preexcitation syndrome
 Ventricular fibrillation, idiopathic
 Ventricular septal defect
 Ventriculo-arterial discordance, isolated
 Ventruto Digirolamo Festa syndrome

Ver–Ves
 Verloes–Bourguignon syndrome
 Verloes–David syndrome
 Verloes–Gillerot–Fryns syndrome
 Verloes–Van Maldergem–Marneffe syndrome
 Verloove–Vanhorick–Brubakk syndrome
 Verminiphobia
 Vernal keratoconjunctivitis
 Verrucous nevus acanthokeratolytic
 Verrucous nevus
 Vertebral body fusion overgrowth
 Vertebral fusion posterior lumbosacral blepharoptosis
 Vertical talus
 Vestibulocochlear dysfunction progressive familial

Vi

Vil–Vis
 Viljoen–Kallis–Voges syndrome
 Viljoen–Smart syndrome
 Viljoen–Winship syndrome
 Vipoma
 Viral hemorrhagic fever
 Virilism
 Virilizing ovarian tumor
 Virus associated hemophagocytic syndrome
 Visceral myopathy familial external ophthalmoplegia
 Visceral steatosis
 Viscero-atrial heterotaxia
 Visna Maedi complex

Vit
 Vitamin A embryopathy
 Vitamin B6 deficiency
 Vitamin B12 deficiency
 Vitamin B12 responsive methylmalonic acidemia, cbl A
 Vitamin B12 responsive methylmalonicaciduria
 Vitamin D resistant rickets
 Vitamin E deficiency
 Vitamin E familial isolated, deficiency of
 Vitiligo mental retardation facial dysmorphism uremia
 Vitiligo psychomotor retardation cleft palate facial dysmorphism
 Vitiligo
 Vitreoretinal degeneration
 Vitreoretinochoroidopathy dominant

Vk–Vu
 VKH
 VLCAD deficiency
 Vocal cord dysfunction familial
 Von Gierke disease
 Von Hippel–Lindau disease
 Von Recklinghausen disease
 Von Voss–Cherstvoy syndrome
 Von Willebrand disease
 Vulvodynia
 Vulvovaginitis

V